Ardeh may refer to:
 Ardeh, Iran
 Ardeh, Lebanon